Alice Lin (born 13 January 1992) is a Taiwanese model and beauty queen based in Canada. In 2018, she won Miss Chinese Vancouver Pageant and went on to participate in Miss Chinese International Pageant 2019.

Early life 
Lin was born in Taipei City, then immigrated to British Columbia when she was 6 years old, living with her parents and two older sisters. She studied at Kerrisdale Elementary School and Point Grey Secondary School. Before graduation from University of British Columbia, she once studied abroad in Tokyo Foreign Language College (Shinjuku), also getting a certificate of JLPT Level N2. She became interested in the performing arts in 2017, when she did a music video for her friend, and decided to transfer to the UBC Department of Theatre & Film.

Lin was crowned Miss Chinese Vancouver Pageant 2018, obtaining Miss Photogenic as well as Lukfook Jewellery Luminous Beauty Award. She represented Vancouver at the Miss Chinese International Pageant 2019 organized by TVB. During the two segments (performance+ Q&A), she didn't showcase herself completely, being knocked out in the Top 10 Semi-Final.

Career 
Lin was a streamer of 17 live streaming app, gallery ambassador, commercial model, host and painter prior to winning the Vancouver pageant. 

After losing the International Pageant in 2019, she talked to Hong Kong-based online media, HK01 that her aspirations of entering TVB, and thus spending more time to improve Cantonese for the sake of personal development.

Performance

TV Programs

Music videos

Radio programs

Awards and nominations

References

External links 

 
 
 《溫哥華華裔小姐競選2018》- 林昀佳 Alice Lin
 《2019國際中華小姐競選》– 候選佳麗 - 19號 林昀佳 - tvb.com

|-
! colspan="3" style="background: #DAA520;" | Miss Chinese Vancouver
|-

|-

1992 births
Living people
Artists from Taipei
Taiwanese emigrants to Canada
Taiwanese emigrants to Hong Kong
Taiwanese television actresses
Taiwanese television presenters
Taiwanese women television presenters
University of British Columbia alumni
Actresses from Taipei